Anjaane Rishte  is a 1989 Bollywood film produced by Rajesh Behl and directed by Diljit Singh and starring Shekhar Suman, Rajesh Behl, Vasantsena, Prema Narayan, Alok Nath, Rakesh Bedi, Raza Murad, Satyen Kappu, Goga Kapoor, Murad and Ashok Kumar. It is family entertainer movie.

Soundtrack

External links 
 

1980s Hindi-language films
1989 films
Films scored by Anand–Milind